Ashok Patki (born 25 August 1941) is an Indian music director and composer; working predominantly in Marathi cinema, theatre and television. He is best known for his very popular compositions like "Mile Sur Mera Tumhara", "Purab Se Surya Uga". Patki has also composed over 5000 jingles and has been awarded with Indian National Film Award for Best Music Direction at 54th National Film Awards in 2006 for a Konkani film, Antarnaad.

Early life 
Patki was born on 25 August 1941 to a Maharashtrian family in Mumbai. He completed his secondary schooling in Gopi Tank Municipal school and is followed by a sister and two brothers. With his growing interest in music, Patki did not show much interest in schooling and decided not to complete his college education. In 2012, Patki wrote a book about his career named as "Saptasur Majhe" ("My Seven Notes"). The book was written in Marathi language and was launched by Manovikas Prakashan. Though Patki did not receive any formal training in music, in August 2013, he started a music school in Pune named as "Sanchari Gurukul", mainly focusing on light and semi-classical Hindustani music, better known as "Sugam Sangeet". Patki noted that the school "aims at bringing back the traditional guru-shishya parampara (master-pupil tradition) in teaching music."

Early career and success 
Since childhood, Patki started playing two Indian musical instruments – Tabla and Harmonium. Patki practised his musical skills with his neighbour and then struggling music composer Sudhir Phadke.  During initial days, Patki accompanied his sister Meena for her musical programs with local orchestra. He was later introduced to the Marathi entertainment industry by singer-composer Jitendra Abhisheki and started composing music for children's stage plays.

Patki worked as an assistant with Jitendra Abhisheki for background music for theatre and S. D. Burman, Shankar Jaikishan, R. D. Burman, Robin Banerjee for film music. The flutist Pandit Hariprasad Chaurasia made Patki certified musician for All India Radio. Patki had started his career as a composer with a devotional album for singer Suman Kalyanpur's album Gaani- Ekdach Yave Sakhya and later accompanied her as a composer for her stage shows abroad. He also started composing music for Marathi theatre with the plays like "Moruchi Mavshi", "Bramhachari" and "Eka Lagnachi Gostha". Patki worked in the advertising field and composed more than 5000 jingles. His first jingle was for Dhantak's Double B soap which was played on Aakashwani everyday at 8am for over 2 decades. Some of his very popular jingles includes "Dhara Dhara", "Jhandu Baam" and "Santoor".

Patki shot to fame with his song and accompanying video promoting national integration and unity in diversity, "Mile Sur Mera Tumhara". The song was composed by Patki, co-composed and arranged by Louis Banks, with lyrics by Piyush Pandey. The song achieved critical acclaim and is considered as "The unofficial Indian anthem". He has been awarded with Indian National Film Award for Best Music Direction at 54th National Film Awards in 2006 for a Konkani film, Antarnaad.

Filmography

Awards 

Plays

 Natyadarpan Puraskar
 1996 – Priyatama
 2007 – Chaar Divas Premache
 Rangdarpan Puraskar
 1999 – Eka Lagnachi Gosht

Feature films

 Maharashtra State Film Awards
 1985 – Ardhangi
 1988 – Aapli Manasa
 2007 – Savalee
 National Film Awards
 2006 – Antarnad
 MICTA Marathi International Cinema and Theatre Awards
 2011 – Mee Sindhutai Sapkal
 Sursingar Puraskar
 1984 – Goshta Dhamal Namyachi
 V. Shantaram Puraskar
 2007 – Savalee

Other awards

 Ananya Puraskar
 Deenanath Mangeshkar Smruti Puraskar (Akhil Bhartiya Natya Aani Kalasankul)
 Gan-Samradnyi Lata Mangeshar Award
 Jankavi P. Savlaram Smruti Puraskar
 Lokshahir Vitthal Umap Smruti Puraskar
 Maharashtra State Cultural Puraskar for Sangitkshetratil 'Kaladan'
 Navartna Puraskar (Shyadri-Television)
 Ram Kadam Puraskar
 Sharad Ratna Gaurav Puraskar
 Vasuandhara Pandit Smruti Puraskar (Bharat Gayan Samaj)
 Zee Puraskar (Various Films, Dramas and Serials)

References

Further reading

External links 
 
 Ashok Patki Official website

1941 births
Marathi people
Musicians from Mumbai
Living people
Music directors
Indian film score composers
Jingle composers
20th-century Indian composers
Best Music Direction National Film Award winners
Indian male film score composers
20th-century male musicians